Osborne Hill is a summit in Central New York Region of New York in the town of Herkimer in Herkimer County, northwest of the village of Herkimer.

References

Mountains of Herkimer County, New York
Mountains of New York (state)